The London Eye, or the Millennium Wheel, is a cantilevered observation wheel on the South Bank of the River Thames in London. It is Europe's tallest cantilevered observation wheel, and the most popular paid tourist attraction in the United Kingdom with over three million visitors annually. It has made many appearances in popular culture.
 
When it opened to the public in 2000 it was the world's tallest Ferris wheel. Its height was surpassed by the  Sun of Moscow in 2022, the  Star of Nanchang in 2006, the  Singapore Flyer in 2008, the  High Roller (Las Vegas) in 2014, and the  Ain Dubai in 2021. Supported by an A-frame on one side only, unlike these taller examples, the Eye is described by its operators as "the world's tallest cantilevered observation wheel". The Eye offered the highest public viewing point in London until it was superseded by the  observation deck on the 72nd floor of The Shard in early 2013.

The London Eye adjoins the western end of Jubilee Gardens (previously the site of the former Dome of Discovery), on the South Bank of the River Thames between Westminster Bridge and Hungerford Bridge beside County Hall, in the London Borough of Lambeth. The nearest tube station is Waterloo.

History

Design and construction

The London Eye was designed by the husband-and-wife team of Julia Barfield and David Marks of Marks Barfield Architects.

Mace was responsible for construction management, with Hollandia as the main steelwork contractor and Tilbury Douglas as the civil contractor. Consulting engineers Tony Gee & Partners designed the foundation works while Beckett Rankine designed the marine works.

Nathaniel Lichfield and Partners assisted The Tussauds Group in obtaining planning and listed building consent to alter the wall on the South Bank of the Thames. They also examined and reported on the implications of a Section 106 agreement attached to the original contract, and also prepared planning and listed building consent applications for the permanent retention of the attraction, which involved the co-ordination of an Environmental Statement and the production of a planning supporting statement detailing the reasons for its retention.

The rim of the Eye is supported by tensioned steel cables and resembles a huge spoked bicycle wheel. The lighting was re-done with LED lighting from Color Kinetics in December 2006 to allow digital control of the lights as opposed to the manual replacement of gels over fluorescent tubes.

The wheel was constructed in sections which were floated up the Thames on barges and assembled lying flat on piled platforms in the river. Once the wheel was complete it was lifted into an upright position by a strand jack system made by Enerpac. It was first raised at 2 degrees per hour until it reached 65 degrees, then left in that position for a week while engineers prepared for the second phase of the lift. The project was European with major components coming from six countries: the steel was supplied from the UK and fabricated in The Netherlands by the Dutch company Hollandia, the cables came from Italy, the bearings came from Germany (FAG/Schaeffler Group), the spindle and hub were cast in the Czech Republic, the capsules were made by Poma in France (and the glass for these came from Italy), and the electrical components from the UK.

Opening
The London Eye was formally opened by the Prime Minister Tony Blair on 31 December 1999, but did not open to the paying public until 9 March 2000 because of a capsule clutch problem.

The London Eye was originally intended as a temporary attraction, with a five-year lease. In December 2001, operators submitted an application to Lambeth Council to give the London Eye permanent status, and the application was granted in July 2002.

On 5 June 2008 it was announced that 30 million people had ridden the London Eye since it opened.

Passenger capsules

The wheel's 32 sealed and air-conditioned ovoidal passenger capsules, designed and supplied by Poma, are attached to the external circumference of the wheel and rotated by electric motors. The capsules are numbered from 1 to 33, excluding number 13 for superstitious reasons. Each of the  capsules represents one of the London Boroughs, and holds up to 25 people, who are free to walk around inside the capsule, though seating is provided. It does not usually stop to take on passengers; the rotation rate is slow enough to allow passengers to walk on and off the moving capsules at ground level. It is stopped to allow disabled or elderly passengers time to embark and disembark safely.

In 2009 the first stage of a £12.5 million capsule upgrade began. Each capsule was taken down and floated down the river to Tilbury Docks in Essex.

On 2 June 2013 a passenger capsule was named the Coronation Capsule to mark the 60th anniversary of the coronation of Queen Elizabeth II.

In March 2020, the London Eye celebrated its 20th birthday by turning several of its pods into experiences themed around London. The experiences included a pub in a capsule, a west end theatre pod and a garden party with flower arrangements to represent the eight London Royal parks.

Ownership and branding

Marks Barfield (the lead architects), The Tussauds Group, and British Airways were the original owners of the London Eye. Tussauds bought out British Airways' stake in 2005 and then Marks Barfield's stake in 2006 to become sole owner.

In May 2007, the Blackstone Group purchased The Tussauds Group which was then the owner of the Eye; Tussauds was merged with Blackstone's Merlin Entertainments and disappeared as an entity. British Airways continued its brand association, but from the beginning of 2008 the name British Airways was dropped from the logo.

On 12 August 2009, the London Eye saw another rebrand, this time being called "The Merlin Entertainments London Eye" to showcase Merlin Entertainments' ownership. A new logo was designed for the attraction—this time taking the form of an eye made out of London's famous landmarks. This coincided with the launch of Merlin Entertainments 4D Experience preflight show underneath the ticket centre in County Hall. The refurbished ticket hall and 4D cinema experience were designed by architect Kay Elliott working with Merlin Studios project designer Craig Sciba. Merlin Studios later appointed Simex-Iwerks as the 4D theatre hardware specialists. The film was written and directed by 3D director Julian Napier and 3D produced by Phil Streather.

In January 2011, a lighting-up ceremony marked the start of a three-year deal between EDF Energy and Merlin Entertainments. On 1 August 2014 the logo was reverted to the previous version, with the name becoming simply "The London Eye".

Coca-Cola began to sponsor the London Eye from January 2015. On the day the sponsorship was announced the London Eye was lit in red.

In February 2020, lastminute.com replaced Coca-Cola as the sponsor. Grammy Award-winning singer Meghan Trainor performed at the launch party on a boat on the Thames overlooking the London Eye.

In March 2020, the wheel was illuminated blue every Thursday at 8pm in support of the National Health Service as part of the ‘Clap for our Carers’ campaign created during the COVID-19 pandemic.

Financial difficulties

On 20 May 2005, there were reports of a leaked letter showing that the South Bank Centre (SBC)—owners of part of the land on which the struts of the Eye are located—had served a notice to quit on the attraction along with a demand for an increase in rent from £64,000 per year to £2.5 million, which the operators rejected as unaffordable.

On 25 May 2005, London mayor Ken Livingstone vowed that the landmark would remain in London. He also pledged that if the dispute was not resolved he would use his powers to ask the London Development Agency to issue a compulsory purchase order. The land in question is a small part of the Jubilee Gardens, which was given to the SBC for £1 when the Greater London Council was broken up.

The South Bank Centre and the British Airways London Eye agreed on a 25-year lease on 8 February 2006 after a judicial review over the rent dispute. The lease agreement meant that the South Bank Centre, a publicly funded charity, would receive at least £500,000 a year from the attraction, the status of which is secured for the foreseeable future. Tussauds also announced the acquisition of the entire one-third interests of British Airways and Marks Barfield in the Eye as well as the outstanding debt to BA. These agreements gave Tussauds 100% ownership and resolved the debt from the Eye's construction loan from British Airways, which stood at more than £150 million by mid-2005 and had been charging an interest rate of 25% per annum.

Critical reception

Sir Richard Rogers, winner of the 2007 Pritzker Architecture Prize, wrote of the London Eye in a book about the project:Big City Review wrote that:

Transport links
The nearest London Underground station is Waterloo, although Charing Cross, Embankment, and Westminster are also within easy walking distance.

Connection with National Rail services is made at London Waterloo station and London Waterloo East station.

London River Services operated by Thames Clippers and City Cruises stop at the London Eye Pier.

References

External links

 
 Architect's website
 
 Live London Eye Webcam

Ferris wheels in the United Kingdom
Amusement rides introduced in 2000
Merlin Entertainments Group
Buildings and structures celebrating the third millennium
Buildings and structures in the London Borough of Lambeth
Buildings and structures on the River Thames
Tourist attractions in the London Borough of Lambeth
Privately owned public spaces
2000 establishments in England